The Adobe World Headquarters is the corporate headquarters of Adobe Systems, located in San Jose, California.

Towers
The complex consists of three towers: West, East and Almaden. The 18-story,  West Tower, first built in 1996, was the sixth tallest in the city of San Jose, and has  of office space. The 16-story,  East Tower has  of office space, and was constructed next to the West Tower in 1998. In 2003, 17-story  Almaden Tower was completed adding . The buildings are situated atop of a  enclosed parking garage. Both the West and East towers house Adobe's Research and Development and Sales and Marketing departments, while the Almaden Tower houses administration and staff.

Design
The buildings are known for their green design. The West Tower is listed as an Energy Star labeled building by the U.S. Environmental Protection Agency. In 2006, all three towers were awarded Leadership in Energy and Environmental Design (LEED) Platinum certification by the United States Green Building Council for environmental sustainability.

San Jose Semaphore
Adobe's Almaden Tower is also notable for having the "San Jose Semaphore," an installation consisting of four rotating lights created in 2006 by artist Ben Rubin. The lights rotate every 7.2 seconds according to a code; the pattern was deciphered in 2007 by Mark Snesrud and Bob Mayo, who discovered the final message being Thomas Pynchon's The Crying of Lot 49. The duo published a whitepaper chronicling their process of decoding.

As of 2012, a new riddle was displayed; the new code was deciphered in 2017 by high school teacher Jimmy Waters from Tennessee. He noticed that a particular sequence in the code might represent an audio silence. Running the full sequence through audio software and changing the pitch, he heard Neil Armstrong's One small step for man speech from the 1969 Apollo moon landing.

References

Corporate headquarters in Silicon Valley
Skyscraper office buildings in San Jose, California
Office buildings completed in 1996
Office buildings completed in 1998
Office buildings completed in 2003
Twin towers